During World War II, Connecticut was a major United States Army Air Forces (USAAF) training center for pilots and aircrews.

The USAAF established Six major airfields under the command of First Air Force, headquartered at Mitchel Army Airfield, New York between 1943 and 1945.

The mission of these bases primarily was wartime training of aircrews by Army Air Forces Training Command (A  precursor to the current-day USAF Air Education and Training Command).

It is still possible to find remnants of these wartime airfields as most were converted into municipal airports.   Hundreds of the temporary buildings that were used survive today, and are being used for other purposes.

Air Fields 
 Bradley Field, 2 miles west of Windsor Locks
 Now: Bradley International Airport (BIAP), Bradley Air National Guard Base (BANGB)
 Brainard Field, 2 miles south-southeast of Hartford
 Now: Hartford-Brainard Airport (HFD)
 Bridgeport Army Air Field, 3 miles southeast of Stratford
 Now: Sikorsky Memorial Airport (BDR)
 Groton Army Air Field, 3 miles southeast of Groton
 Now: Groton-New London Airport (GON)
 New Haven Army Air Field, 3 miles southeast of New Haven
 Now: Tweed New Haven Regional Airport (HVN)
 Rentschler Field, 3 miles east-southeast of Hartford
 Was: Rentschler Field (airport) (1933-1997)
 Now: Rentschler Heliport (CT88) and Rentschler Field (football stadium)

See also 
 First Air Force
 United States Army Air Forces

References
 Maurer, Maurer (1983). Air Force Combat Units Of World War II. Maxwell AFB, Alabama: Office of Air Force History. .
 Ravenstein, Charles A. (1984). Air Force Combat Wings Lineage and Honors Histories 1947-1977. Maxwell AFB, Alabama: Office of Air Force History. .
 Thole, Lou (1999), Forgotten Fields of America : World War II Bases and Training, Then and Now - Vol. 2.  Pictorial Histories Pub .

External links

 01
World War II
Airfields of the United States Army Air Forces in the United States by state
United States World War II army airfields